Lin Ying or Linying may refer to

People

Lin Ying (badminton) (born 1963), Chinese badminton player 
Maya Lin (born 1959), or Lin Ying, American architectural designer 
Linying (singer-songwriter) (born 1994), Singaporean singer-songwriter

Other

 Linying County
 Linying railway station